Les-bains or Les bains (French: "the baths"), usually indicating the presence of a spa, may refer to:

Places
Aix-les-Bains, commune in the Savoie department in the Rhône-Alpes region in south-eastern France
Alet-les-Bains, commune in the Aude department in the Languedoc-Roussillon region in southern France
Amélie-les-Bains-Palalda, commune in the Pyrénées-Orientales department in southern France
Andernos-les-Bains, commune in the Gironde department in south-western France
Arromanches-les-Bains, commune in the Calvados department in the Basse-Normandie region in north-western France
Aulus-les-Bains, commune in the Ariège department in south-western France
Bains-les-Bains, commune in the Vosges department in Lorraine in north-eastern France
Canton of Bains-les-Bains, administrative and electoral grouping of communes in the Vosges department in eastern France
Balaruc-les-Bains, commune in the Hérault department in the Languedoc-Roussillon region in southern France
Bourbonne-les-Bains, commune in the Haute-Marne department in north-eastern France
Brides-les-Bains, commune in the Savoie department in the Rhône-Alpes region in south-eastern France
Cambo-les-Bains, commune in the Pyrénées-Atlantiques department in Aquitaine in south-western France
Charbonnières-les-Bains, commune in the Rhône department in eastern France
Digne-les-Bains, commune in and capital of the Alpes-de-Haute-Provence department in southern France
Arrondissement of Digne-les-Bains, arrondissement in the Alpes-de-Haute-Provence department in southern France
Divonne-les-Bains, commune in the Ain department in eastern France
Donville-les-Bains, commune in the Manche department in north-western France
Enghien-les-Bains, commune in the northern suburbs of Paris, France
Eugénie-les-Bains, commune in the Landes department in Aquitaine in south-western France
Évaux-les-Bains, commune in the Creuse department in the Limousin region in central France
Canton of Évaux-les-Bains, administrative and electoral grouping of communes in the Creuse department in the Limousin region in central France
Évian-les-Bains, commune in the northern part of the Haute-Savoie department in the Rhône-Alpes region in eastern France
Gréoux-les-Bains, commune in the Alpes-de-Haute-Provence department in south-eastern France
Lamalou-les-Bains, commune in the Hérault department in Languedoc-Roussillon in southern France
Luxeuil-les-Bains, commune in the Haute-Saône department in the Franche-Comté region in eastern France
Manapany-les-Bains, village on the island of Réunion
Mers-les-Bains, commune in the Somme department in Picardie in northern France
Mondorf-les-Bains, commune and town in south-eastern Luxembourg
Le Monêtier-les-Bains, commune in the Hautes-Alpes department in south-eastern France
Canton of Le Monêtier-les-Bains, administrative and electoral grouping of communes in the Hautes-Alpes department in south-eastern France
Montrond-les-Bains, commune in the Loire department in central France
Néris-les-Bains, commune in the Allier department in the Auvergne region in central France
Niederbronn-les-Bains, commune in the Bas-Rhin department in Alsace in north-eastern France
Morsbronn-les-Bains, commune in the Bas-Rhin department in Alsace in north-eastern France
Ogeu-les-Bains, commune in the Pyrénées-Atlantiques department in south-western France
Plombières-les-Bains, commune in the Vosges department in Lorraine in north-eastern France
Canton of Plombières-les-Bains, administrative and electoral grouping of communes in the Vosges département in eastern France
Rennes-les-Bains, commune in the Aude department in southern France
Saint-Gervais-les-Bains, commune in the Haute-Savoie department in the Rhône-Alpes region in south-eastern France
Saint-Laurent-les-Bains, commune in the Ardèche department in southern France
Salins-les-Bains, commune in the Jura department in Franche-Comté in eastern France
Sierck-les-Bains, commune in the Moselle department in Lorraine in north-eastern France
Thonon-les-Bains, commune in the Haute-Savoie department in the Rhône-Alpes region in south-eastern France
Arrondissement of Thonon-les-Bains, arrondissement in the Haute-Savoie department in the Rhône-Alpes region in south-eastern France
Vals-les-Bains, commune in the Ardèche department in southern France
Vernet-les-Bains, commune in the Pyrénées-Orientales department in southern France
Yverdon-les-Bains, municipality in the district of Jura-Nord vaudois in the canton of Vaud in Switzerland

Other
Aix-les-Bains Circuit du Lac, motor-racing track in operation at Aix-les-Bains from 1949 to 1960
Gare d'Alet-les-Bains, railway station in Alet-les-Bains
Les Bains Des Docks, aquatic Center in the city of Le Havre, France
Les Bains Douches 18 December 1979, 1979 live album by the British band Joy Division
Arboretum de Bains-les-Bains, arboretum in Bains-les-Bains
Gare de Cambo-les-Bains, railway station in Cambo-les-Bains
Chambéry Aix-les-Bains Airport, alternative name for Chambéry Airport
Gare d'Ogeu-les-Bains, railway station in Ogeu-les-Bains
Gare de Saint-Gervais-les-Bains-Le Fayet, railway station in Saint-Gervais-les-Bains
Funiculaire de Thonon-les-Bains, funicular railway in the spa town of Thonon-les-Bains
Village arboretum de Vernet-les-Bains, arboretum in Vernet-les-Bains
Youks-les-Bains Airfield, abandoned military airfield in Algeria
Yverdon-les-Bains, castle in the municipality of Yverdon-les-Bains in the Canton of Vaud in Switzerland

See also
Bain
Bains